The 2012 Boston Breakers season, is the club's seventh overall year of existence, fourth consecutive year, and first year as a member of the WPSL Elite League

Review and events

Match results

Key

Preseason

WPSL EL 
Note: Results are given with Boston Breakers' score listed first.

Club

Roster

Management and staff 
Front Office
Coaching Staff

Standings

See also 
 2012 Women's Premier Soccer League Elite season
 2012 Women's Professional Soccer season
 2012 in American soccer
 Boston Breakers

References 

2012
American soccer clubs 2012 season
Boston Breakers